Beyt-e Fayil may refer to:
 Beyt-e Fayil 1
 Beyt-e Fayil 2